Blossom is a town in Lamar County, Texas, United States. The population was 1,402 at the 2020 census.

History

Blossom was originally known as Blossom Prairie, but was shortened to Blossom in 1888. Davy Crockett reportedly entered Texas near Blossom Prairie.

Geography

Blossom is located at  (33.661395, –95.383675).

Demographics

As of the 2020 United States census, there were 1,402 people, 547 households, and 369 families residing in the city. As of the census of 2000, there were 1,439 people, 571 households, and 424 families residing in the city. The population density was 573.2 people per square mile (221.4/km2). There were 606 housing units at an average density of 241.4 per square mile (93.2/km2). The racial makeup of the city was 94.30% White, 2.08% African American, 1.18% Native American, 0.14% Asian, 1.39% from other races, and 0.90% from two or more races. Hispanic or Latino of any race were 6.67% of the population.

There were 571 households, out of which 34.2% had children under the age of 18 living with them, 59.5% were married couples living together, 9.8% had a female householder with no husband present, and 25.7% were non-families. 23.3% of all households were made up of individuals, and 11.9% had someone living alone who was 65 years of age or older. The average household size was 2.52 and the average family size was 2.96.

In the city, the population was spread out, with 26.7% under the age of 18, 8.4% from 18 to 24, 27.2% from 25 to 44, 24.2% from 45 to 64, and 13.6% who were 65 years of age or older. The median age was 35 years. For every 100 females, there were 103.0 males. For every 100 females age 18 and over, there were 92.2 males.

The median income for a household in the city was $28,235, and the median income for a family was $33,750. Males had a median income of $27,813 versus $21,136 for females. The per capita income for the city was $15,143. About 10.9% of families and 12.7% of the population were below the poverty line, including 15.9% of those under age 18 and 13.7% of those age 65 or over.

Education
The city of Blossom is served by the Prairiland Independent School District.

Notable people
 Paul Elliott Martin, bishop in the Methodist Church

References

External links
 Blossom Texas information - Lamar County Station

 
Cities in Texas
Cities in Lamar County, Texas